Tim Horton is an American football coach and former player. He is currently the Special teams coordinator at the United States Air Force Academy. He has also had coaching stops at Appalachian State University, Kansas State University, the University of Arkansas, Auburn University, and Vanderbilt University.

Coaching career

Appalachian State
Following Horton's playing career, he joined the coaching staff at Appalachian State. In his time with the Mountaineers, Horton helped guide the program to a 67–32 record during eight seasons, including Southern Conference championships in 1991 and 1995 and five NCAA Division I-AA playoff appearances. He coached the wide receivers and tight ends in his first three seasons, before transitioning to the running backs prior to the 1993 season.

Air Force (1st stint)
Horton was hired as the wide receivers coach at Air Force prior to the 1999 season. He held this position through the 2004 season, before switching over to running backs for the 2005 season. As a result of his work, Horton was recognized by the Fellowship of Christian Athletes Colorado chapter as one of its 2004 coaches of the year.

Kansas State
In 2006, Horton served as the running backs coach for the Kansas State Wildcats. He helped guide the team to a Texas Bowl appearance while mentoring future NFL running backs Thomas Clayton and James Johnson.

Arkansas
In the summer of 2007, Horton joined the staff at his alma mater, Arkansas, after initially rejoining the Air Force staff as offensive coordinator. While working for Houston Nutt at Arkansas, Horton coached the running backs and served as the recruiting coordinator. He was recognized by Rivals.com and ESPN.com as one of the nation's top recruiters. He also coached the 2007 Doak Walker Award winner, Darren McFadden, as well as coaching Felix Jones to All-America honors. Dennis Johnson, Michael Smith, Jonathan Williams and Knile Davis earned all-SEC honors.

Auburn
From 2013 through 2016, Horton coached the running backs for Gus Malzahn and the Auburn Tigers football team. He also served as the recruiting coordinator in 2015-2016 before being promoted to special teams coordinator for the 2017 season.

Horton helped develop four running backs that led the SEC in rushing: Tre Mason (2013), Cameron Artis-Payne (2014), Kamryn Pettway (2016), and Kerryon Johnson (2017). Mason and Johnson both earned SEC offensive player of the year honors, and Mason was a Heisman Trophy finalist.

As the special teams coordinator,  Horton coached kicker Daniel Carlson, who was the SEC's special teams player of the year. Horton became the only assistant in league history to coach the SEC offensive and special teams players of the year in the same season.

Vanderbilt
Horton spent two years (2019 – 2020) as the running backs coach for Derek Mason at Vanderbilt. He coached future NFL running back Ke'Shawn Vaughn.

Air Force (2nd stint)
Following the dismissal of the Vanderbilt staff, Horton returned to Air Force as the special teams coordinator and running backs coach in January 2021.

Playing career
Horton played wide receiver and returned punts during his career at Arkansas from 1986 to 1989. He was a four time letterwinner, and three-year starter. As a senior, Horton was a team captain and earned second-team All-Southwest Conference honors. He helped lead the Razorbacks to four straight bowl appearances and back-to-back SWC titles (1988-1989).

Horton was a two time all-state running back while attending Conway High School in Conway, Arkansas. He was inducted to the Conway High School Wampus Cat Hall of Fame in 2019, and the Arkansas Sports Hall of Fame in 2021.

Personal life
Horton's father, Harold Horton is a former Razorback player and assistant coach, and won two NAIA national championships as the head coach at Central Arkansas. He also served as an administrator for the Razorback Foundation.

Horton and his wife, Lauren, are the parents of a daughter, Caroline, and a son, Jackson. He earned his bachelor's degree is marketing management.

Horton authored a book titled, Complete Running Back.

References

Living people
American football wide receivers
Arkansas Razorbacks football players
Year of birth missing (living people)